Scutelliformis is a genus of rust fungi in the family Phragmidiaceae. The genus is monotypic, containing the single species Scutelliformis bicornus.

References

External links

Pucciniales
Taxa described in 2007
Fungi of South America
Monotypic Basidiomycota genera